Chubar Rural District may refer to:
 Chubar Rural District (Shaft County)
 Chubar Rural District (Talesh County)